The 2013 Newfoundland and Labrador Scotties Tournament of Hearts women's provincial curling championship, was held January 16–20 at the Bally Haly Golf & Curling Club in  St. John's, Newfoundland and Labrador. The winning Stacie Devereaux rink would go on to represent Newfoundland and Labrador at the 2013 Scotties Tournament of Hearts in Kingston, Ontario.

Teams

Standings

Results
All draw times listed in Newfoundland Standard Time Zone (UTC−03:30).

Draw 1
January 16, 7:30 PM

Draw 2
January 17, 2:00 PM

Draw 3
January 17, 7:30 PM

Draw 4
January 18, 2:30 PM

Draw 5
January 18, 7:30PM

Playoffs
Due to Devereaux being undefeated, she must be beaten twice by Strong in order for Strong to win.

Final 1
January 19, 14:00

Final 2
January 19, 19:30

References

Newfoundland and Labrador
Sport in St. John's, Newfoundland and Labrador
Curling in Newfoundland and Labrador
Newfoundland and Labrador Scotties Tournament of Hearts